"Family Affair" is a song by American singer Mary J. Blige. It was written by Blige, her brother Bruce Miller, Camara Kambon, Michael Elizondo, and producer Dr. Dre for her fifth studio album, No More Drama (2001).

The single topped the Billboard Hot 100 for six weeks starting from November 3, 2001, becoming Blige's first and only Hot 100 number-one single as well as her first top-10 single in five years. It was the 12th-biggest song of the 2000s decade in the US and the 99th-biggest song of all-time in the country as of 2018. Rolling Stone ranked it number 95 on their list of 100 Best Songs of the 2000s decade. Outside the United States, the song reached number one in France and the top 10 in 14 additional countries across Europe and Oceania, peaking at number two on the Eurochart Hot 100.

Background
Dr. Dre created an initial version of the musical portion of "Family Affair" in studio on September 13, 2000, using a bass player and a keyboard player. His studio engineers entitled this version of the song "Fragile" for record-keeping purposes. Near the end of 2000, he sent Blige the instrumental track.

Blige recorded vocals over the music based on lyrics penned by Miller, Kambon and Elizondo. Several weeks later, on January 10, 2001, a near-final but non-lyrical portion of "Fragile" was transferred from digital to analog format and renamed "Family Affair". In late May or early June 2001, at Dr. Dre's suggestion, Blige added a bridge to the song, for which she alone crafted the lyrics. A remix featuring rappers Jadakiss and Fabolous appears on the US CD single.

Composition
Family Affair is written in the key of G-sharp minor with a moderate tempo of 94 beats per minute. The song follows a chord progression Cm–Gm7–Cm–Gm7, and Blige's vocals span from G3 to B4.

Music video
The accompanying music video was directed by Dave Meyers. The video begins with Blige at a nightclub, wearing skin-revealing outfits. The video was filmed at the nightclub in 2001.

Live performances

On September 6, 2012, Blige performed the song at the last night of the Democratic National Convention in Charlotte, North Carolina. Ten years later, she also performed it in the Super Bowl LVI halftime show.

Track listings

Credits and personnel
Credits are taken from the No More Drama album booklet.

Studios
 Recorded at Record One (Sherman Oaks, California) and Quad Recording Studios (Manhattan, New York)
 Mixed at Record One (Sherman Oaks, California)
 Mastered at The Hit Factory (New York City)

Personnel

 Mary J. Blige – writing, all vocals
 Bruce Miller – writing
 Dr. Dre – writing (as Andre Young), production, mixing
 Camara Kambon – writing, keyboards
 Mike Elizondo – writing, bass
 Mauricio "Veto" Iragorri – engineering
 Chris Ribando – engineering
 Tom Sweeney – assistant engineering
 Kin Bengoa – assistant engineering
 Larry Chatman – project coordination
 Herb Powers – mastering

Charts

Weekly charts

Year-end charts

Decade-end charts

All-time charts

Certifications and sales

Release history

References

2001 songs
2001 singles
Mary J. Blige songs
Songs written by Mary J. Blige
Songs written by Mike Elizondo
Songs written by Dr. Dre
Song recordings produced by Dr. Dre
MCA Records singles
Music videos directed by Dave Meyers (director)
American dance songs
Billboard Hot 100 number-one singles
SNEP Top Singles number-one singles